DHL is an trademark for international courier, parcel, and express mail operation of Deutsche Post.

DHL may also refer to:

Related businesses and subsidiaries
 Deutsche Post
 DHL Aviation
 DHL Air UK
 DHL de Guatemala
 DHL International Aviation ME
 DHL Aero Expreso
 DHL Ecuador
 DHL Global Forwarding
 DHL Freight
 DHL Supply Chain

Other uses
 "DHL" (song), 2019 single by American singer Frank Ocean
 Doctor of Humane Letters
 Doctor of Hebrew Literature, see Jewish Theological Seminary of America